Porfirio Méndez (18 April 1966 – 24 January 2017) was a Paraguayan middle-distance runner. He competed in the men's 800 metres at the 1988 Summer Olympics. He died of a heart attack while running.

References

External links
 

1966 births
2017 deaths
Athletes (track and field) at the 1988 Summer Olympics
Paraguayan male middle-distance runners
Olympic athletes of Paraguay
Athletes (track and field) at the 1995 Pan American Games
Pan American Games competitors for Paraguay
Place of birth missing
20th-century Paraguayan people
21st-century Paraguayan people